Keith Irving (born 1958) is a Canadian politician, who was elected to the Nova Scotia House of Assembly in the 2013 provincial election. A member of the Nova Scotia Liberal Party, he represents the electoral district of Kings South. Irving has previously served on Wolfville Town Council and Iqaluit Town Council. Irving is a former architect by trade.

In 2017, Irving was re-elected in Kings South.

On February 23, 2021, Irving was appointed to the Executive Council of Nova Scotia as Minister of Environment and Climate Change, and Chair of Treasury and Policy Board. Irving was re-elected in the 2021 election, however the Rankin Liberals lost government becoming the Official Opposition.

Electoral record

|-
 
|Liberal
|Keith Irving
|align="right"| 4,269
|align="right"| 46.71
|align="right"| + 7.46
|-
 
|Progressive Conservative
|Peter Harrison
|align="right"| 2,496
|align="right"| 27.31
|align="right"| + 4.61
|-
 
|New Democratic Party
|Stephen Schneider
|align="right"| 1,921
|align="right"| 21.02
|align="right"| - 14.53
|-

|}

|-
 
|Liberal
|Keith Irving
|align="right"| 3,939
|align="right"| 39.25
|align="right"|
|-
 
|New Democratic Party
|Ramona Jennex
|align="right"| 3,568
|align="right"| 35.55
|align="right"|
|-
 
|Progressive Conservative
|Shane MacKenzie Buchan
|align="right"| 2,278
|align="right"| 22.70
|align="right"|
|-

|}

References

Living people
Canadian architects
Iqaluit city councillors
Members of the Executive Council of Nova Scotia
Nova Scotia Liberal Party MLAs
Northwest Territories municipal councillors
Nova Scotia municipal councillors
People from Kings County, Nova Scotia
21st-century Canadian politicians
People from Moncton
1958 births